Harriet Anne Zuckerman (born July 19, 1937) is an American sociologist and professor emerita of Columbia University. 

Zuckerman specializes in the sociology of science.
She is known for her work on the social organization of science, scientific elites, the accumulation of advantage, the Matthew effect, and the phenomenon of multiple discovery.

Zuckerman served as the Senior Vice President of the Andrew W. Mellon Foundation from 1991 to 2010, overseeing the Foundation's grant program in support of research, libraries and universities. She is known as an authority for her studies of educational programs, and her support of research universities, scholarship in the humanities, graduate educational programs, research libraries, and other centers  for advanced  study.

Education
Harriet Zuckerman received her A.B. degree from Vassar College in 1958 and her Ph.D. from Columbia University in 1965.  She held a Woodrow Wilson Fellowship from 1958-1959.

Career
Zuckerman was a Lecturer in Sociology at Barnard College in New York City  from 1964-1965.  She returned to Columbia University an Assistant Professor of Sociology in 1965, where she served as Project Director of the Bureau of Applied Social Research. She became an Associate Professor in 1972, and a Full Professor in 1978 . She chaired the Sociology department from 1978-1982. In 1992, she retired from Columbia University, becoming a professor emerita.

Zuckerman served as president of the Society for Social Studies of Science in 1990-1991.
In 1989, she joined the Andrew W. Mellon Foundation as a senior advisor, becoming the Senior Vice President in 1991. She retired from the Vice Presidency in May 2010.

Work
Zuckerman's research has focused on the social organization of science and scholarship.  She is the author of the 1977 book, Scientific Elite:  Nobel Laureates in the United States, which has been credited with defining the direction of work in the field for the next two decades.  As a basis for her research, Zuckerman used a database to examine more than 60,000 academics, in a powerful demonstration of the self-reinforcing dynamics of American academic culture. Zuckerman's findings, particularly her "fundamental notion" of  "accumulation of advantage", questioned assumptions about  creativity, achievement, eminence, and greatness.

The empirical data Zuckerman analyzed, along with work by Robert K. Merton and others, documented ways in which women scientists were "systematically disadvantaged in educational attainment, productivity, funding, lab space, and recognition".
Zuckerman and others have carried out subsequent work on prizes and other rewards; their impact on productivity, collaboration, and authorship; and on the effectiveness of interventions whose intention is to support women and members of other underrepresented populations.

Scientific Elite is also a fascinating introduction to the phenomenon of multiple discovery in the fields of science and technology.  Zuckerman further examined conditions and processes influencing the introduction and adoption of scientific ideas in later work. In 1978, she introduced the idea of "postmature scientific discovery".

The sociologist of science Robert K. Merton later credited Zuckerman as a co-author of his work on the Matthew effect, writing '“It is now [1973] belatedly evident to me that I drew upon the interview and other materials of the Zuckerman study to such an extent that, clearly, the paper should have appeared under joint authorship.” 
The  overlooking of Zuckerman's contribution can be considered an  example of a pattern which she noted, which has been nicknamed the Matilda effect by science historian Margaret Rossiter. Zuckerman married Robert K. Merton in 1993.

Bibliography
 
 
 
 
 
  Harriet Zuckerman papers, 1887-2014, bulk 1963-1992 at the Rare Book and Manuscript Library, Columbia University, New York, NY

Awards
Zuckerman is a Fellow of both the American Association for the Advancement of Science (1979) and  the American Academy of Arts and Sciences (1985) and a Guggenheim Fellow (1981-1982), among others. She is also a member of the American Philosophical Society.

See also
 Andrew W. Mellon Foundation
 Historic recurrence
 List of multiple discoveries
 Multiple discovery
 Robert K. Merton

References

1937 births
American sociologists
Vassar College alumni
Columbia University alumni
Living people
American women sociologists
21st-century American women
Members of the American Philosophical Society